WJJF (94.9 FM) is a radio station licensed to Montauk, New York and serving the eastern Long Island and southeastern Connecticut areas. The station is owned by Full Power Radio (controlled by John Fuller), and offers a news/talk format. WJJF signed on February 27, 2012.

External links 
 
 

JJF
News and talk radio stations in the United States
Radio stations established in 2012
Mass media in Suffolk County, New York